John Willoughby Gray MBE (5 November 1916 – 13 February 1993) was an English actor of stage and screen.

Early life
Willoughby Gray was born in London to his mother, Mary Henderson; his father, John Gray, was killed in action in Iraq soon after his birth.  In 1918 Mary remarried and Willoughby became the stepson of Lieutenant General Henry Pownall.

Second World War
Gray served with distinction during the Second World War with GHQ Liaison Regiment (Phantom). For most of the campaign in Europe he commanded a reconnaissance unit with 11th Armoured Division. For his gallant and distinguished services in the North West Europe campaign, he was appointed MBE. His recommendation reads:
Captain Gray has commanded a divisional patrol with outstanding success throughout the campaign. The resource and initiative shown by him at all times has resulted in a great deal of vital information reaching Army and Corps HQ much more quickly than would otherwise have been the case, in addition, he has shown great enterprise and complete disregard for his own personal safety on many occasions, notably whilst carrying out reconnaissances in the Antwerp area during the advance through Belgium. The bearing of this officer under arduous conditions and his cheerfulness and willingness to do any work delegated to him unhesitatingly have been an example to those with whom he came in contact.

Acting career
He achieved popularity in the mid-1950s after making 38 appearances on the television series The Adventures of Robin Hood. He also appeared in similar television shows such as The Buccaneers and The Adventures of William Tell. He appeared as 'Pete' in Harold Pinter's The Birthday Party on its very first run in 1958, this being just one of countless stage performances he made. Though over-shadowed by his stage career, Gray made a handful of popular films, notably as a priest in Laurence Olivier's film Richard III (1955), The Mummy (1959), Absolution (1978), The Hit (1984) and as the elderly and kind king in The Princess Bride (1987). He appeared in the James Bond film A View to a Kill (1985) as the retired Nazi doctor and Max Zorin's (Christopher Walken) head scientist Dr. Carl Mortner/Hans Glaub.

In the late 1980s, he appeared in the BBC drama Howards' Way as banker Sir John Stevens. In Sergei Bondarchuk's 1970 film Waterloo, he is credited as both an actor (playing Captain Ramsey) and a military consultant.

Death
Gray died aged 76 in February 1993. His wife, who wrote as Felicity Gray, (née Margaret Andraea) was a choreographer, speaker and writer on ballet, who notably taught Gene Tierney for her role in Never Let Me Go.

Selected filmography

The Mark of Cain (1947) – Photographer (uncredited)
Guilt Is My Shadow (1950) – Detective
Shadow of the Past (1950) – Chauffeur
Seven Days to Noon (1950) – Bit Part (uncredited)
The Woman with No Name (1950) – Group Captain
The Golden Year (1951) – Sir Norman Grenleigh
Top Secret (1952) – British Officer
Phantom Caravan (1954) – Major Thornhill
Stranger from Venus (1954) – Tom Harding
Richard III (1955) – 2nd Priest
The Mummy (1959) – Dr. Reilly
The Dirty Dozen (1967) – German Officer (uncredited)
The Man Outside (1967) – Detective Inspector
Waterloo (1970) – Ramsey
Young Winston (1972) – Gladstone (uncredited)
Dead Cert (1974) – Coroner
Absolution (1978) – Brigadier Walsh
The Gamekeeper (1980) – Duke
The Hit (1984) – Judge
A View to a Kill (1985) – Dr. Carl Mortner / Hans Glaub
Solarbabies (1986) – Canis
The Princess Bride (1987) – the King

References

External links
 

1916 births
1993 deaths
Male actors from London
English male stage actors
English male film actors
English male television actors
Deaths from cancer in England
20th-century English male actors
Royal Artillery officers
British Army personnel of World War II
Members of the Order of the British Empire